South of Tana River is a 1963 Danish family film directed by Bent Christensen and starring Poul Reichhardt.

Cast
Poul Reichhardt as Axelson
William Rosenberg as Schmidt
Axel Strøbye as Derek
Bent Christensen as Dupont
Charlotte Ernst as Eva Axelson
Terry Mathews as Hitching
Ronald Burgess as Game Warden

External links

1963 films
1963 adventure films
Danish adventure films
1960s Danish-language films
Films directed by Bent Christensen
Films directed by Sven Methling
Films set in Kenya
Films shot in Kenya